"Alone in My Room" is a song by Skin, which was the first single to be released from Skin's second album, Fake Chemical State. It was released as download only and the first single to be released from Skin since joining V2 Records. The song was co-written with Paul Draper, of Mansun fame, and was his first piece of work since Mansun.

Track listing
Since the single was download only, there was no set track listing. There was, however, a remix of the single available via iTunes.

 "Alone in My Room"
 "Alone in My Room" (Fuck Me I'm Famous Remix) – iTunes release

2003 singles
Skin (musician) songs
Songs written by Paul Draper (musician)
Songs written by Skin (musician)
2003 songs
V2 Records singles